Lionel William Cooper (18 February 1922 – 16 May 1987) was an Australian professional rugby league footballer who played in the 1940s and 1950s.  A state and international representative winger, he played in Sydney for the Eastern Suburbs club and in England for Huddersfield.

Australian career
After being spotted playing Australian Rules Football in a services team in Darwin by Ray Stehr in 1941, Cooper joined the Eastern Suburbs club. Stehr invited Cooper to trial with the Roosters following World War II.

A powerful , Cooper played in just 6 matches before gaining selection for New South Wales. Later that year Cooper was a member of Eastern Suburbs' 8th premiership-winning team. In 1946 Cooper represented Sydney, New South Wales and Australia; he played in all three tests against the Great Britain Lions that year at home. Cooper also took out the 'NSW Player of the Year Award' in 1946.

The Gregory's reference describes him as a bullocking, bruising winger who was a great finisher of back-line movements. His hard-running style incorporated a hip-bumping technique to brush off defenders.

British career
In 1947 he joined English club Huddersfield, where he had 9 successful seasons - scoring 420 tries, including 71 in the 1951–52 season. In one match that year, against Keighley, he scored a record 10 tries. Also joining Cooper was his friend Johnny Hunter, a full-back, and a little later Pat Devery, an Australian test centre who formed a partnership with Cooper on the left.

Cooper continued to play test rugby league whilst at Huddersfield, playing for 14 matches for the Other Nationalities in the International Championship between 1949 and 1953. He also played for the British Empire XIII versus New Zealand on Wednesday 23 January 1952 at Stamford Bridge.

Cooper played left-wing, i.e. number 5, in Huddersfield's 4–11 defeat by Bradford Northern in the 1949 Yorkshire County Cup Final during the 1949–50 season at Headingley Rugby Stadium, Leeds on Saturday 29 October 1949. He also played left-wing in the 18–8 victory over Batley in the 1952 Yorkshire Cup Final at Headingley on Saturday 15 November 1952, scoring 3 tries.

He also played in Huddersfield's 2–20 defeat by Wigan in the 1949–50 Championship Final at Maine Road, Manchester on Saturday 13 May 1950.

Cooper played on the wing and scored two tries in Huddersfield's 15–10 victory over St. Helens in the 1953 Challenge Cup Final during the 1952–53 season at Wembley Stadium, London  on Saturday 25 April 1953, in front of a crowd of 89,588. Following a leg injury to Pat Devery during the match, Cooper moved to centre and took over the kicking duties.

Cooper's Testimonial match at Huddersfield took place in 1955.

Family
Three of his brothers, Col, Reg and Cec Cooper, played with the Canterbury Bankstown club in Sydney, and another, Noel, played for St George.

References

Bibliography
 Whiticker, Alan and Hudson, Glen The Encyclopedia Of Rugby League Players
 Andrews, Malcolm (2006) The ABC of Rugby League Austn Broadcasting Corpn, Sydney
 Pollard, Jack (ed) Gregory's Guide to Rugby League (1965), Grenville Publishing Sydney

Footnotes

External links
France defeated in ‘Battle of the Boulevard’
Floodlit feast at Odsal*

1922 births
1987 deaths
Australian Army personnel of World War II
Australia national rugby league team players
Australian expatriate sportspeople in England
Australian rugby league players
British Empire rugby league team players
Combined Nationalities rugby league team players
Huddersfield Giants players
Other Nationalities rugby league team players
Rugby league wingers
Sydney Roosters players
Place of birth missing
Australian Army soldiers